Country-wide local elections for seats in municipality and county councils were held throughout Norway on 11 and 10 September 1995. For most places this meant that two elections, the municipal elections and the county elections ran concurrently.

Results

Municipal elections
Results of the 1995 municipal elections.

County elections
Results of the 1995 county elections.

References

1995
1995
1995 elections in Europe
Local elections